Gavan-e Pain (also Romanized as Gavān-e Pā'īn; also known as Gashar) is a village in Kangan Rural District, in the Central District of Jask County, Hormozgan Province, Iran. At the 2006 census, its population was 881, in 150 families.

References 

Populated places in Jask County